is a Japanese anime television series produced by Gaina.  The series aired from January 11 to March 29, 2019.  An anime spinoff titled Hulaing Babies☆Petit aired from January 8 to March 25, 2020.

Plot
The series follows a group of young girls who aspire to become hula dancers.

Characters

Production and release
The series was announced on November 5, 2016, during a "Magical Hawaiians" event. The series will be directed by Yoshinori Asao and animated by Gaina. Character designs for the series are done by Ryōzō Ōminato.  Ikoma is handling series composition, while F.M.F is composing the music. The series aired from January 11 to March 29, 2019, and broadcast on TV Tokyo, AT-X and FCT. It consisted of 5-minute episodes.

A spinoff series titled Hulaing Babies☆Petit aired from January 8 to March 25, 2020, with the cast and staff reprising their roles.  The spinoff series consists of 80-second episodes.

References

External links
  
 

2019 anime television series debuts
2020 anime television series debuts
Anime with original screenplays
Hula